In the Path of the Storm is the sixth book of The Animals of Farthing Wood series. It was first published in 1989 and has since been included in a single book with The Siege of White Deer Park and Battle for the Park in the "Second Omnibus" edition (Hutchinson, 1995).

Plot summary
The death of the Great Stag, the leader of the deer of White Deer Park, leaves its inhabitants at the mercy of his successor Trey, a strong and fearsome stag who believes there is no room for the smaller animals in the nature reserve. Meanwhile, Tawny Owl grows tired of bachelorhood and leaves the park in search of a mate.

Television series
The events of the book are covered throughout the third season of The Animals of Farthing Wood (TV series), though the sequence of events is changed slightly.

See also

1989 British novels
1989 fantasy novels
Animals of Farthing Wood books
Children's fantasy novels
Hutchinson (publisher) books
1989 children's books